Moira Forsyth (1905 – April 1991) was an English stained-glass artist. Her father was Gordon Forsyth a Scottish ceramics designer, stained-glass artist, and teacher. They both made works for the St. Joseph's Church in Burslem, Stoke-on-Trent, Staffordshire. She made her name for her stained-glass works, such as those found at Guildford Cathedral, Norwich Cathedral and Eton College Chapel.

Most of her work life centred on The Glass House studio in Fulham in Greater London with other artists, such as Wilhelmina Geddes, Mary Lowndes, and Alfred J. Drury. She also made and exhibited ceramics and created a large ceiling mural for the St Joseph's Catholic Church in Burslem, Staffordshire.

Personal life
Moira Forsyth was born in 1905 in Stafford, Staffordshire, to Gordon Forsyth. Her father's career took the family to the Manchester area by 1911, although they returned to Staffordshire after the First World War.

After training and her professional career in Stoke-on-Trent and London, Forsyth moved to Farnham, Surrey. She was initially trained in pottery and taught it, as well as making murals, but she was primarily known for her stained-glass designs and work. She worked in the Ministry of Town and Country Planning during the years of World War II. She died in April 1991. Her requiem was held at Farnham's St Joan of Arc Church where Forsyth was a member.

Education and career
At Stoke-on-Trent, Forsyth studied ceramics in 1921 at the Burslem School of Art, where her father was principal. While there, she also created and exhibited her works, including an exhibition in 1925 at White City Fair, "to worldwide acclaim". Orders began coming in from around the world. The following year she opened up her own studio for ceramics design, but due to the 1926 general strike when the kilns were not operating, she needed to close down her work place.

She then attended the Royal College of Art, after having received a scholarship in a national contest. One of her instructors was Martin Travers. Taking up an interest in stained glass while there, glasswork became her professional aspiration. Forsyth then moved to the Greater London area where she first worked at St Oswald Studios and then at The Glass House studio where she worked with Wilhelmina Geddes and the studio owners Mary Lowndes and Alfred J. Drury.

During her career she was a member of the International Society of Christian Artists and Society of Catholic Artists member and president.

There are more than 1,000 historical files about Moira Forsyth, dating from 1877 through 1989, at the Victoria and Albert Museum in London. These include family certificates of birth and death (1877 to 1976) and papers directly related to her, including business and family correspondence, applications for commissions or memberships, drawings and sketches, project files, photographs and more.

Works

Forsyth received prestigious commissions for cathedrals as well as for schools and parish churches. She has been described as "one of England's most notable stained glass artists". Her work reflected use of slab glass, cross-hatching and colours of the Arts and Crafts movement.

This is a list of some of her more important works.

Exhibitions
Forsyth frequently exhibited at art galleries and the Royal Academy.

Awards
Forsyth received the Queen's award for lifelong services to the arts.

Notes

References

External links
 Moira Forsyth's Artwork for St. Joseph's Church, Burslem
 The Moira Forsyth Windows at Holy Family Church, Farnham, Surrey, plus great biographical information, references and links

Images
 "Benedictine Window", Norwich Cathedral
 "Benedictine Window" detail, Norwich Cathedral
 Moira Forsyth Glass, Norwich Cathedral
 St Benet Biscop detail, Norwich Cathedral
 Crucifix, Our Lady of Perpetual Succour Church
 Moira's works at St. Joseph Roman Catholic Church, Burslem
 Ashton-under-Lyne, St Michael, Nativity

British stained glass artists and manufacturers
Alumni of Burslem School of Art
1905 births
1991 deaths
People from Stafford
Female Catholic artists
Catholic decorative artists
Catholic stained glass artists